Rogers Sings Rogerstein is the fifth studio album by You Am I frontman, Tim Rogers. The album was released on 24 August 2012.

Track listing
All Or Nothing - 4:00
Drivin At Night- 4:25
One O The Girls - 2:54
Part Time Dads - 3:13
Out Of Our Tiny Lil' Minds - 2:49
Go On Out, Get Back Home - 3:32
The FJ Holden - 3:46
Walkin Past The Bars - 2:50
I Love You Just As You Are, Now Change - 3:06
Didn't Plan To Be Here Either, Baby - 2:58
Beefy Jock Guys And Modern Dance Music - 3:35
If Yer Askin, I'm Dancin' - 3:31
Let's Be Dreadful - 2:17

Personnel
Tim Rogers - Guitar, Vocals
Shane O'Mara
Peter Lawler
Melanie Robinson
Bruce Haymes
Ben Hendry
John Bedgegood
Shel Rogerstein
Lizanne Richards - additional vocals on 'All Or Nothing'
Sal Kimber - additional vocals on 'If Yer Askin' & "Walking Past The Bars'
Rebecca Barnard - additional vocals on "Out Of Our Tiny Lil Minds' & 'The FJ Holden'

Charts

External links
 Tim Rogers official site
 You Am I official site

2012 albums
Tim Rogers albums